Cănești is a commune in Buzău County, Muntenia, Romania. It's composed of six villages: Cănești, Gonțești, Negoșina, Păcuri, Șuchea and Valea Verzei.

Notes

Communes in Buzău County
Localities in Muntenia